Samil may also refer to:

 Samil, an alternate name of the archangel Samael
 Samil, Portugal, a parish in the municipality of Bragança
 Sam-il Movement, a Korean independence movement during the Japanese occupation
 Samiljeol, a public holiday in South Korea on 1 March which commemorates the Samil Movement
 SAMIL Trucks, South African military logistical transport vehicles

See also
 Yahya Samil Al Suwaymil Al Sulami, a Saudi Arabian national, held in extrajudicial detention in Guantanamo Bay Naval Base